The 1986 Sun Belt Conference men's basketball tournament was held February 27–March 1 at the Birmingham–Jefferson Civic Center in Birmingham, Alabama.

Jacksonville upset hosts UAB in the championship game, 70–69, to win their second Sun Belt men's basketball tournament.

The Dolphins, in turn, received an automatic bid for the 1986 NCAA tournament. They were joined in the tournament by fellow Sun Belt members Old Dominion, UAB, and Western Kentucky, all of whom received at-large bids.

Format
There were no changes to the existing tournament format. All eight conference members were placed into the initial quarterfinal round and each team was seeded based on its regular season conference record.

Bracket

See also
Sun Belt Conference women's basketball tournament

References

Sun Belt Conference men's basketball tournament
Tournament
Sun Belt Conference men's basketball tournament
Sun Belt Conference men's basketball tournament
Sun Belt Conference men's basketball tournament